George Best (1946–2005) was a Northern Irish international footballer.

George Best may also refer to:

People
 George Best (MP) (1759–1818), MP for Rochester, UK 
 George Best (priest) (died 1829), Canadian clergyman
 George Best (chronicler) (died 1584), chronicler of Frobisher's sea voyages
 George A. Best, English early 20th century football goalkeeper
 George Newton Best (1846–1926), American bryologist

Other uses
 George Bestial, a character in Viz magazine 
 George Best (album), a 1987 album by The Wedding Present
 "George Best – A Tribute", a 2005 single by Brian Kennedy and Peter Corry

See also
 George Best Belfast City Airport

Best, George